Akanu Ibiam International Airport , also known as Enugu Airport, is an airport serving Enugu, the capital city of Enugu State of Nigeria, and nearby cities, such as  Abakaliki, Awka, Onitsha, Nnewi, Afikpo, Okigwe, Nsukka, Ugep, Orlu, Idah, Otukpo and Ogoja.  The airport is named after the late Akanu Ibiam (1906–1995), a medical doctor and statesman who hailed from Afikpo in Ebonyi State.

The airport was closed on February 10, 2010, by the Federal Airports Authority of Nigeria (FAAN) for the first phase of major renovation and expansion works. The airport was re-opened on 16 December 2010, but the second and third phase of the construction work is still ongoing. The airport is being prepared for its new status as an international airport.

Airlines and destinations

Statistics 

These data show number of passengers movements into the airport, according to the Federal Airports Authority of Nigeria's Aviation Sector Summary Reports.

Accidents and incidents
In August 2019, six years after being constructed, the airport's runway collapsed. The airport was closed for urgent repair work and a government investigation launched.

See also
Transport in Nigeria
List of airports in Nigeria
List of the busiest airports in Africa

References

External links 

OurAirports - Enugu
SkyVector - Akanu Ibiam

Airports in Nigeria
Enugu
Buildings and structures in Enugu State